West African Airways Corporation, or WAAC for short, was an airline that operated from 1946 to 1958, jointly owned by the governments of Britain's four west African colonies, namely The Gambia, the Gold Coast (now Ghana), Nigeria, and Sierra Leone. The carrier was headquartered at the Airways House in Ikeja, Nigeria, and operated from its hub in Lagos Airport. It was dissolved on 30 September 1958, after all the shareholder countries but Nigeria set up their own national airlines following their independence. As the sole remaining major stockholder of the airline, the government of Nigeria continued to operate it as WAAC Nigeria, which was eventually renamed Nigeria Airways and became the flag carrier of the country.

History
Prospections for the development of aviation in the British West African Territory trace as back as 1944 when, following World War II, Lord Swinton ordered the first studies. The British Ministry of Civil Aviation supported the Sanford Committee, which was established to that particular end, and both entities recommended the formation of the West African Air Transport Authority.

The origins of West African Airways Corporation can be traced back to 1946, when it was established by the British Overseas Airways Corporation (BOAC), and economically supported by four West African British colonies, Nigeria being the major shareholder (68%), followed by the Gold Coast (29.5%), Sierra Leone (2%), and The Gambia holding the balance. It began operations in October 1947, following the delivery of its first aircraft, an event that took place on 14 September 1947. The De Havilland Dove aircraft inaugurated WAAC's first scheduled service from Lagos to Calabar during October 1947.

The company was aimed at providing the British West Africa with air transport facilities, to connecting it with Dakar and Khartoum in order to provide passengers with a gateway to the Americas and the Middle East, respectively, and to operating feeder flights that connected with the Europe-bound BOAC Hermes services at Accra, Lagos and Kano. The close ties with BOAC were evidenced by the fact that WAAC actually acted as an agent for the British state carrier in Nigeria and the Gold Coast.

On 31 March 1948 WAAC became responsible for operation of the inter-Colonial West African coastal services and extended operation to Freetown, Bathurst and Dakar. The airline began a Lagos-Khartoum service with Bristol 170s in April 1950. This was suspended in August 1953.

WAAC became very popular in the early 1950s for offering at least four Bristol Freighter-operated second-class services at discounted airfares, cheaper than any other mean of transportation.

As the member states gained Commonwealth status from the United Kingdom, they set up their own carriers—Ghana Airways, Sierra Leone Airways, and Gambia Air Shuttle. WAAC was formally dissolved in 1958, as Nigeria was the only state eventually having a participation in the airline. WAAC assets and liabilities were inherited by WAAC (Nigeria), that operated as “Nigerian Airways” effective 1 October 1958. WAAC (Nigeria) was later rebranded Nigeria Airways.

Livery
The WAAC livery consisted of a green cheatline bordered by thinner gold lines. An airborne green elephant named Skypower was painted in a golden circle background at both sides, in the forward part of each aircraft.

Destinations
Following is a list of destinations served by WAAC, grouped by country served. Each destination is provided with the city served, the name of the airport and both its International Air Transport Association three-letter code (IATA airport code) and its International Civil Aviation Organization four-letter code (ICAO airport code). Current names have been adopted wherever possible.

Fleet
WAAC was the first airline in operating Marathons commercially. The corporation operated the following aircraft throughout its history:

 Bristol Freighter
 Bristol Wayfarer
 de Havilland Dove
 de Havilland Heron
 Douglas DC-3
 Handley Page Marathon

Accidents and incidents
According to Aviation Safety Network, the airline experienced two accidents/incidents throughout its history, one of them leading to fatalities.

Fatal accidents
All 13 occupants of the aircraft were killed. Structural failure of the left-hand side mainplane was officially determined to be the cause of the accident.

Non-fatal hull-losses
27 July 1951: A Bristol 170 Freighter 21E, registered VR-NAX, landed short of the runway at Kaduna Airport.

See also

Airlines of Africa
Transport in Gambia
Transport in Ghana
Transport in Nigeria
Transport in Sierra Leone

Footnotes

Notes

References

Bibliography

Further reading
 

British West Africa
Defunct airlines of Nigeria
Defunct airlines of Ghana
Defunct airlines of Sierra Leone
Defunct airlines of the Gambia
Airlines disestablished in 1958
Airlines established in 1946
1946 establishments in the British Empire
Defunct companies based in Lagos
1958 disestablishments in the British Empire